Pleasant Valley, is a valley in two counties in two states adjacent states, White Pine County, Nevada and Juab County, Utah. It lies between the Kern Mountains on the south, and South Mountains to the northwest and the Deep Creek Range on the north.

References 

Valleys of Nevada
Valleys of White Pine County, Nevada
Valleys of Utah